"Homer Loves Flanders" is the sixteenth episode of the fifth season of the American animated television series The Simpsons. It originally aired on the Fox network in the United States on March 17, 1994. In the episode, Ned Flanders invites Homer to a football game and the two become good friends. However, Ned soon grows weary of Homer's overbearing friendship and stupid antics, and actually begins to hate him.

The episode was written by David Richardson and directed by Wes Archer. It was the last episode to be pitched by writer Conan O'Brien before he left The Simpsons. The episode features cultural references to films such as Terminator 2: Judgment Day, The Deadly Tower, and The Ten Commandments, and songs such as "Two Tickets to Paradise", "Macho Man", and "Helter Skelter".

Since airing, the episode has received mostly positive reviews from television critics. It acquired a Nielsen rating of 10.9, and was the third highest-rated show on the Fox network the week it aired.

Plot
Homer unsuccessfully tries to win tickets for a football game on a radio contest. Ned wins the tickets and invites Homer as his guest. Although he dislikes Ned, Homer accepts because he desperately wants to attend the game. Ned pays for all of the food and persuades the winning quarterback to give the game ball to Homer. Overwhelmed by Ned's generosity, Homer becomes friends with Ned and his family.

Homer begins acting overly grateful and annoys Ned and his family to no end by interrupting their family time together. The Flanders family and the Simpson family go on a camping trip together but do not get along. When the Simpsons start a food fight, Ned tells his wife that he has grown to hate Homer.

Upon returning home, Homer remains oblivious to Ned's animosity. He arrives at the Flanders' house expecting to play golf, but Ned and his family get in their car and race off without him. Pulled over by Chief Wiggum for speeding, Ned takes a sobriety test as disapproving townspeople watch. At church, when the entire congregation bow their heads in prayer, Homer inhales very loudly through his nose, causing Ned to yell at him. This alarms the worshippers, who become even more upset with Ned. But Homer sticks up for Ned and convinces them to give him another chance.

The next week, everything returns to normal as Homer is once again annoyed by Ned. The episode ends with the Simpsons spending the night in Homer's great Uncle Boris' haunted house, which he recently inherited. After turning out the lights, they see something that causes them to scream in terror.

Production
"Homer Loves Flanders" was the last episode to be pitched by Conan O'Brien before he left The Simpsons. David Richardson was assigned to write it, and Wes Archer to direct it. Richardson wrote the episode at a Motel 6 in Hemet, California while he was dating an actress who was shooting a film there. In this season, the staff wanted to take a deeper look at the relationships of the characters. One of the things they wanted to explore in particular was what Homer and Flanders have in common and how they could turn into friends. Former show runner David Mirkin enjoyed making Homer and Flanders get along because they do not normally act that way.

The episode begins with the Simpson family watching a news broadcast in which the news anchor Kent Brockman calls the United States Army a "kill-bot factory". Mirkin said this was a joke the staff "particularly loved to do" because it pointed out how negative and mean-spirited news broadcasts can be, and how they are seemingly "always trying to scare everybody" by creating panic and depression. In one scene in the episode, Marge begins hallucinating after drinking from Springfield's water supply, which has been spiked with LSD by Springfield's rival town, Shelbyville. The Fox network's censors wanted the scene to be cut from the episode because they did not like the idea of Marge "getting high" on LSD. Mirkin defended the scene, and argued Marge was not "doing it on purpose", so the censors ultimately allowed the scene to remain in the episode. The censors also hated Ned's response to his wife telling him to drive his car faster ("I can't! It's a Geo!") fearing they could lose the car company's sponsorship, but Mirkin kept the line in. In another scene, Homer becomes frustrated at God for not getting the tickets to the game, so yells at a waffle stuck to the ceiling that he believes is God. Marge points out that it is just a waffle that Bart threw up there. This scene, inspired by some melted caramel stuck to the ceiling of the Simpsons writers' room, is one of Mirkin's and Richardson's "all time favorite" jokes.

Cultural references

When Homer hears the 1978 song "Two Tickets to Paradise" by Eddie Money on the radio, he sings along and plays air guitar. As Homer is eating nachos at the football game, he makes up a song called "Nacho Man", a reference to Village People's 1978 song "Macho Man". Homer's "Rappin' Ronnie Reagan" cassette is a reference to the 1984 Broadway show and novelty music video Rap Master Ronnie and Ronald Reagan. When Flanders is mistakenly arrested for taking drugs, Chief Wiggum asks him "Where's your Messiah now?", a line commonly mistakenly believed to be spoken by Edward G. Robinson's character Dathan in the 1956 film The Ten Commandments but in fact originates from Billy Crystal's stand-up impersonation of Robinson. Ned's dream involves him shooting at people inside the university clock tower based on the 1975 film The Deadly Tower, itself based on Charles Whitman's 1966 killing spree. The scene where Homer chases Flanders's car is a parallel of the sequence in Terminator 2: Judgment Day, in which Robert Patrick's character T-1000 chases the heroes in the police car after escaping from the hospital. Homer morphing through the Flanders hedge also parodies how the T-1000's shape shifting abilities were shown in the film. It has since become a popular internet meme. When Rod and Todd are watching television in the Flanders's living room, a picture of Leonardo da Vinci's painting The Last Supper can be seen behind them. The homeless shelter that Homer and Flanders visit is called Helter Shelter, a reference to the 1968 song "Helter Skelter" by The Beatles. Helter Shelter would later go on to be used as title of an episode in the show's fourteenth season.

Reception

Critical reception
Since airing, the episode has received mostly positive reviews from television critics.

In 2007, Patrick Enright of Today called the episode his eighth favorite of the show. He praised the references to Terminator 2 in the episode, as well as Lisa's self-referential quote about how, "by next week, we'll be back to where we started from, ready for another wacky adventure."

The authors of the book I Can't Believe It's a Bigger and Better Updated Unofficial Simpsons Guide, Warren Martyn and Adrian Wood, thought the episode had "some great existential musings" from Lisa. They added that it also "contains some nice moments highlighting the differences between the Simpsons and the Flanders."

DVD Movie Guide's Colin Jacobson said: "I always remembered ["Homer Loves Flanders"] to be a great episode – and I recalled correctly. Sure, the show goes with a less than creative presence[sic]; it’s an easy story to make characters behave in atypical ways. However, the development of the theme is terrific, as we learn the friendship of Homer Simpson is worse than the antagonism of Homer Simpson." DVD Talk gave the episode a 4 out of 5 score.

Patrick Bromley of DVD Verdict gave the episode a B− grade, claiming the "rather large dose of sentimentality" and "fewer moments of absurdity" in the episode gave it "the feeling that it belongs in one of the series' earlier seasons".

The Orlando Sentinels Gregory Hardy named it the second best episode of the show with a sports theme.

A moment in the episode where Homer backs into Ned's hedges became an internet meme in the 2010s. The scene was later referenced in the season 30 episode, "The Girl on the Bus" where Homer texts Lisa a GIF of himself going into the hedge. The scene was later referenced again in the season 32 episode, "Wad Goals", where Bart tells his friends "I've seen my dad do this" immediately before showing them how to back into a hedge. In the season 34 episode "Treehouse of Horror XXXIII", during a Westworld parody segment named Simpsons World, multiple tourists heckle an android Homer to do the "bush meme" by pushing him into a hedge, Bart then removes Homer's inability to intentionally harm humans, causing him to push the tourists into the hedge, killing them and commenting "I'm so sick of that stupid hedge!"

Ratings
In its original American broadcast, "Homer Loves Flanders" finished 43rd in the ratings for the week of March 14–20, 1994, with a Nielsen rating of 10.9. The episode was the third highest-rated show on the Fox network that week, following Beverly Hills, 90210 and Melrose Place.

References

External links

 
 

The Simpsons (season 5) episodes
1994 American television episodes
Film and television memes